Didia is a town in Liberia on the coast.  It lies about 30 km to the southeast of the town of Buchanan.

Transport 

It is the proposed site of a new port for the export of iron ore from Simandou and Zogota in Guinea.

See also 

 Iron ore in Africa
 Railway stations in Liberia
 Railway stations in Guinea - cross-border

References 

Grand Bassa County
Populated places in Liberia